Kottoppadam-I is a village in Palakkad district in the state of Kerala, India. Kottoppadam-I, Kottoppadam-II and Kottoppadam-III come under the administration of the Kottappadam gram panchayat.

Demographics
Kottopadam.I: 12,936
Kottopadam.II: 13,295
Kottopadam.III: 12,517
Total population of Kottopadam Area: 38,748

Important Landmarks
 Ariyur thod
 Government School, Bheemanad

Suburbs and Villages
 Venga
 Bheemanad
 A.B.Road
 Ariyoor
 Aryambavu
 Kombam
 Kodakkad
 Ambazhakode
 Kandamangalam
 Kacheriparampu
 Thiruvizhamkunnu
 Kanjhiram kunne

References

Villages in Palakkad district